Andrea Beatriz Villagrán Antón (born 2 January 1992) is a Guatemalan politician. She has been a member of Congress since September 2017. Villagrán, who took office at age 25, is the youngest woman to serve in Congress of Guatemala.

References 

1992 births
Living people
Guatemalan activists
People from Guatemala City
Members of the Congress of Guatemala
Rafael Landívar University alumni
21st-century Guatemalan women politicians
21st-century Guatemalan politicians